Chahar, also known as Chaha'er, Chakhar or Qahar, was a province of the Republic of China in existence from 1912 to 1936, mostly covering territory in what is part of Eastern Inner Mongolia. It was named after the Chahar Mongols.

Administration and history 
Chahar Province is named after the Chahar, a tribal group of the Mongols who live in that area. The area was controlled (in part or fully) by various empires that ruled over China's north including the Han, Tang, Liao, and Jin dynasties. After the unification of the Mongol tribes under Genghis Khan, the area came under Yuan rule. After the Yuan dynasty (1271–1368), the area was a battleground between the Ming dynasty and Northern Yuan. Then the Chahar tribe became the personal appanage of the monarchs of the Northern Yuan dynasty since the reign of Batumongke Dayan Khan (r. 1479–1517). By the Qing dynasty (1644–1912), Chahar was a "Zhangyuan Special Region", although Yao Xiguang proposed making Chahar a province as early as 1908.

Republic of China era 
In 1913, the second year of the Republic of China, Chahar Special Administrative Region was created as a subdivision of Zhili Province, containing 6 Banners and 11 counties:

In 1928, it became a province. The last five counties on the above list (starting from Xinghe) were partitioned to Suiyuan province. And ten counties were included from Xuanhua Subprefecture (宣化府), Koubei Circuit (口北道), Hebei Province:

All banners belong to the Shilingol League (锡林郭勒盟).

From 1937 to 1945, it was occupied by Japan and made a part of Mengjiang, a Japanese-controlled region led by Mongol Prince Demchugdongrub of the Shilingol Alliance. The Chahar People's Anti-Japanese Army Alliance (察哈爾民眾抗日同盟軍) was established in Kalgan on May 26, 1933 by Feng Yuxiang (馮玉祥) and Ji Hongchang (吉鴻昌).

1948–1952 
In 1952, six years after becoming communist, the province was abolished and divided into parts of Inner Mongolia, Beijing Municipality and Hebei.

Geography 
Chahar Province was divided north-south by the Great Wall, with North Chahar being the larger in area and South Chahar, with the capital, Zhangjiakou, being far larger in population. In North Chahar most of the land was part of the northeastern extension of the Gobi Desert.

Bordered 
 North: Xing'an
 North and West: Mongolia
 West and South : Suiyuan
 South: Shanxi and Hebei
 East: Rehe and Liaobei

See also

Notes

References 

Provinces of the Republic of China (1912–1949)
Former provinces of China
History of Inner Mongolia
States and territories established in 1912
States and territories disestablished in 1936
1912 establishments in China
History of Zhangjiakou